The Riverside Concrete Company-Lamont's Market is a historic market building at 2 Charles Street in Newton, Massachusetts.  Built in 1910, it is a rare example of concrete block construction, manufactured by its first owner, the Riverside Concrete Company.  The market served the neighborhood, as well as visitors to the nearby Norumbega amusement park.  The second-floor apartment was added in 1928.

The building was listed on the National Register of Historic Places in 1990.  It presently houses residences.

See also
 National Register of Historic Places listings in Newton, Massachusetts

References

National Register of Historic Places in Newton, Massachusetts
Industrial buildings and structures on the National Register of Historic Places in Massachusetts
Commercial buildings completed in 1910
Buildings and structures in Newton, Massachusetts
Retail buildings in Massachusetts
1910 establishments in Massachusetts